Villefranche-de-Conflent is historically a town in the Conflent region of Catalonia, and now a commune in the Pyrénées-Orientales department in southern France.

Geography 
Villefranche-de-Conflent is located in the canton of Les Pyrénées catalanes and in the arrondissement of Prades.

The town's confined site, at about 440 m above sea level, is relatively level ground surrounded by 
 the northeast-flowing river Têt (on the town's west and north), 
 the Cady, which flows north to empty into the Têt (on the east), and 
 a peak (at nearly 800 m), less than 800 m away (on the south).

Transport 
Roads
The N116 from Perpignan on the Mediterranean passes, as a two-lane highway, between the southern town wall and an embankment cut into the high ground to the south; this route continues west into the adjacent Cerdagne region.

Train

The town's train station starts and ends the route of the scenic Yellow train.

History 
The town's access to the French Cerdagne makes it an important strategic location. It was already occupied by Celtic tribes, and then by Romans, Visigoths, Muslim Moors, and then the Spanish. Fortifications around the town were built by the counts of Conflent at the end of the 9th century; in 1374, Villefranche resisted the siege of Jaume III the son of last king of Majorca. In the mid-1400s, when it was a Spanish possession, parts were adapted to allow for firearms. In July 1654, the French captured the city after eight days, and the troops of Louis XIV took Puigcerda from the Spaniards. When the territory was ceded to the French after the Treaty of the Pyrenees (1659), the town became an important French defense against possible Spanish incursions. The town was part of the program of construction and improvement of outlying French defenses, which included building the Fort Libéria on a hill above the village by Sébastien Le Prestre de Vauban, the military engineer of Louis XIV, and as such was listed as a World Heritage Site in 2008.

The defensive walls of the town remain.

Population

See also
 Communes of the Pyrénées-Orientales department
 Les Plus Beaux Villages de France

Notes

References
 Ayats, Alain, "Les fortifications de Vauban", Trabucaire, 2005,

External links

 Webpage about the fortifications
 Webpage about Fort Liberia near Villefranche

Communes of Pyrénées-Orientales
Plus Beaux Villages de France
Vauban fortifications in France